The State Register of Heritage Places is maintained by the Heritage Council of Western Australia. , 61 places are heritage-listed in the Shire of Boddington, of which just one is listed on the State Register of Heritage Places, Asquith Bridge, which was completely destroyed in a bush fire in 2015.

List
The Western Australian State Register of Heritage Places, lists the following heritage registered places within the Shire of Boddington:

State Register of Heritage Places
State Register of Heritage Places in the Shire of Boddington:

Shire of Boddington heritage-listed places
The following places are heritage listed in the Shire of Boddington but are not State registered:

References

Boddington
Heritage